Joy Chowdhury is a Bangladeshi film actor. He started his career in 2012 with the film Ek Joban. He is best known for Hitman, Chini Bibi, Ajob Prem and Antor Jala.

Early life 
Joy Chowdhury was born in Magura District, Bangladesh. He is the son of Oliul and Rowshonara Islam.He also has an elder brother, Ataul Islam(Mukti). He married Kazi Romana Islam on December 4, 2013.They have One children, Son Raad Shamat Chowdhury(Born 2022). He spent his early days in Magura with his parents. His father is a businessman. His father died on 5 January 2007. Joy Chowdhury complit his bachelor degree in UODA (BBA) & post graduation In Asian University (MBA).He is an Bangladeshi actor, film producer,entrepreneur,Businessman.He made his film debut with the commercially successful Ak Joban(2012).

Career 
Joy debuted with the film Ek Joban, which was directed by F.I Manik in 2012. His second film was Hitman (2014), which was directed by Wazed Ali Sumon. Later he appeared in several films, including Valobashle Dosh Ki Tate (2014), Khoniker Valobasha (2015), Chini Bibi (2015), Ajob Prem (2015), and Antor Jala (2017).

Filmography

References

External links 
 

People from Magura District
Bangladeshi male film actors
21st-century Bangladeshi male actors
1986 births
Living people